Suroor Salim (born 14 August 1982) is an Emirati footballer. He currently plays as a winger .

Career
He formerly played for Al-Shabab, and Emirates Club.

References

External links
 

1982 births
Living people
Emirati footballers
Al Shabab Al Arabi Club Dubai players
Emirates Club players
UAE Pro League players
UAE First Division League players
Association football wingers
Place of birth missing (living people)